is participation in the physical work needed to maintain the Zen monastery. According to tradition, it was emphasized by Baizhang Huaihai, who is credited with establishing an early set of rules for Chan (Chinese Zen) monastic discipline, the Pure Rules of Baizhang. As the Zen monks farmed, it helped them to survive the Great Anti-Buddhist Persecution more than other sects which relied more on donations. These rules are still used today in many Zen monasteries. From this text comes the well-known saying "A day without work is a day without food" (一日不做一日不食 "One day not work, one day not eat").

See also
 Samue – work clothes when engaged in samu

Sources

Weblinks 

 Zen temple Ryumon Ji, Samu

References

Buddhist monasticism
Zen
Mindfulness (Buddhism)